The Tongva are a Native American people of California, USA.

Tongva may also refer to:

Tongva language
Tongva Park, in Santa Monica, California